March Town United Football Club is a football club based in March, Cambridgeshire, England.

History
The club was established as March Town in 1885. They joined the Peterborough & District League in 1908, but left after a single season. The club rejoined the league in 1911, before leaving in 1913. They subsequently became members of the Cambridgeshire League and were Division One runners-up in 1921–22. However, the club finished bottom of the division the following season. They returned to Division One in 1925, but finished bottom of the table again in 1926–27. Amidst league reorganisation, the club became members of Division 1B in 1928, where they remained until rejoining the Peterborough & District League in 1931.

In 1947–48 March won the Division One title, and moved up to the United Counties League. In 1950 the club were renamed March Town United, having moved to March GER United's GER Sports Ground after World War II. They were United Counties League champions in 1953–54, after which they transferred to the Eastern Counties League. The club won the Cambridgeshire Invitation Cup in 1954–55, beating Cambridge United 3–2 in the final. In 1955–56 March reached the first round of the FA Cup after eight qualifying matches, before losing 4–0 at Brentford; they also finished as runners-up in the Eastern Counties League, a feat repeated in 1960–61.

The 1978–79 season saw March reach the first round of the FA Cup again, this time losing 2–0 at Swindon Town. They won the Eastern Counties League title in 1987–88. The league gained a second division the following season, with March becoming members of the Premier Division. They finished bottom of the Premier Division in 1996–97 and were relegated to Division One. The club finished bottom of Division One in 2000–01, 2001–02, 2006–07 and 2013–14, but avoided being relegated to the county leagues. In 2021 the club were promoted to the Premier Division based on their results in the curtailed 2019–20 and 2020–21 seasons. In 2022 they were transferred to the Premier Division South of the United Counties League.

Ground
The club played at Estover Road, Gaul Drove and Burrowmoor Road before settling at the Avenue in 1923, a ground shared with the cricket club and bequeathed to the town by Mr Morton. After World War II the club moved to the GER Sports Ground.

Honours
Eastern Counties League
Champions 1987–88
United Counties League
Division One champions 1953–54
Peterborough & District League
Division One champions 1947–48
Cambridgeshire Invitation Cup
Winners 1954–55

Records
Best FA Cup performance: First round, 1955–56, 1978–79
Best FA Trophy performance: Second qualifying round, 1970–71, 1972–73
Best FA Vase performance: Third round, 1975–76, 1988–89
Record attendance: 7,500 vs King's Lynn, FA Cup second qualifying round, 1956

See also
March Town United F.C. players
March Town United F.C. managers

References

External links
Official website

 
Football clubs in England
Football clubs in Cambridgeshire
Association football clubs established in 1885
1885 establishments in England
Peterborough and District Football League
Cambridgeshire County Football League
United Counties League
Eastern Counties Football League
March, Cambridgeshire